2XL Games, founded in 2005, is a video game development studio based in Phoenix, Arizona.

List of games

References

2XL Games